Cystiscus maskelynensis is a species of very small sea snail, a marine gastropod mollusk or micromollusk in the family Cystiscidae.

Description
The size of the shell attains 1.66 mm.

Distribution
This marine species occurs off Vanuatu.

References

Cystiscidae
Gastropods described in 2005
Maskelynensis